Dracula II: Ascension is a 2003 direct-to-video American-Romanian vampire film, directed by Patrick Lussier. It stars Jason Scott Lee, Stephen Billington and Diane Neal. Filmed entirely in Romania by Castel Film Studios, the film is the sequel to Dracula 2000. It was released direct-to-video on June 7, 2003.

The film was followed by a sequel, Dracula III: Legacy (2005).

Plot
The film focuses on a small group of overzealous scientists who hope to use Dracula's desiccated - but still alive - body to discover the secret of immortality. Elizabeth Blaine, working at the New Orleans morgue, receives Dracula's "corpse" from her friend and co-worker Luke following the events of the first film. Elizabeth examines the body and pricks her finger on a fang in what is supposed to be a human mouth. This leads her to alert her boyfriend Lowell, who is suffering from an ultimately fatal degenerative sickness. Lowell claims a wealthy investor wants to fund their research into the mysterious corpse.

On their heels is Father Uffizi, seemingly the Vatican's official vampire hunter. He has been given the task of not only killing Dracula, but granting him absolution (as the Church realizes that Dracula is in fact Judas Iscariot), which would allow the vampire to rest in peace. Unbeknownst to the Church, Uffizi has been infected with vampirism after being scratched by a fang during a previous hunt.  Each day he exposes himself to the sun and whips his shirtless back, burning out the vampiric infection while he screams in pain.

Luke doubts that Dracula is a purely natural phenomenon. He surrounds the now-awake vampire with folkloric wards like mustard seeds and knots. Meanwhile, Elizabeth feels increasingly strange as the infection in her grows, as does her attraction/bond to Dracula. Another member of the team injects himself with Dracula's blood and becomes a vampire, setting out to feed. He kills a woman, making her undead like himself. Uffizi finds and kills them both.

Lowell reveals that there is no "secret investor" and that he used Elizabeth and the others to find a cure for himself. An injection "cures" him, but he survives mere moments before Uffizi arrives. Uffizi tells Elizabeth, now on the verge of becoming a vampire herself, to enter the sunlight and burn away her vampirism. Eric, a member of the team turned by Dracula, attacks the group but is killed with holy water by Luke after having his face bit off by Dracula and turns into a strange faceless vampire. Uffizi goes after a now-free Dracula, telling Luke he will make a great vampire hunter someday.

Uffizi catches up with Dracula, who taunts him with the knowledge that Elizabeth will simply die and Uffizi knows it. In his weakened state, Dracula is not quite a match physically for Uffizi. The priest manages to get a whip around Dracula's neck and begins the rite of absolution. Dracula then taunts Uffizi with images of Christ's betrayal and crucifixion, and insinuates that he turned Christ into a vampire. Elizabeth, now a vampire, attacks and wounds Uffizi. She leaves with Dracula, who lets Uffizi live because he knows he will follow and eventually find him.

Cast 
 Jason Scott Lee as Father Uffizi
 Jason London as Luke
 Khary Payton as Kenny
 Craig Sheffer as Lowell
 Diane Neal as Elizabeth Blaine
 Brande Roderick as Tanya
 Tom Kane as the voice of Cartoon Voice of Doctor
 John Light as Eric
 Stephen Billington as Dracula II
 Nick Phillips as Officer Smith
 John Sharian as Officer Hodge
 Roy Scheider as Cardinal Siqueros
 David J. Francis as Jesus

Production

Development
Despite Dracula 2000 being a box office bomb, Dimension Films approached filmmakers Patrick Lussier and Joel Soisson for a sequel. The pair decided to use their original pitch for Dracula 2000, where Dracula is captured and studied. The character of Father Uffizi was initially a part of Dracula 2000, but was ultimately taken out in later drafts. Lussier and Soisson would write each scene individually and trade their scenes for revisions. The filmmakers opted not to include the year in the title as neither were "overly enamored" with the title of the previous film. Stephen Billington was cast as Dracula in place of Gerard Butler due to scheduling conflicts.

Filming
Production took place in the fall in Romania, concurrently with Dracula III: Legacy. Roy Scheider shot all of his scenes for both films in a single day.

Reception
Critical reaction to Dracula II: Ascension has been mixed to negative. On Rotten Tomatoes, Dracula II: Ascension holds an approval rating of 0% from seven reviews.

Rebecca Isenberg of Entertainment Weekly said: "Dracula II is dripping with clichéd scare tactics, from abandoned houses to bathtubs filled with blood, [and] death scenes are equally predictable". John Puccio of DVD Town said: "The movie is a tired collection of tired clichés bound together by tired characters in tired roles. By the time the eighty-five minutes of movie are over, you'll be pretty tired, too. Nothing happens that is in the least bit frightening. ... [T]he filmmakers splatter the screen with buckets of blood, severed heads, and gory, close-up autopsies, but while all this may be gross and disgusting, it's not scary".

Patrick Naugle of DVD Verdict said: "In Dracula II: Ascension, co-writer/director Patrick Lussier has crafted an only mediocre sequel that is sub-par in every respect: acting, plot, and special effects. In place of an interesting story is a movie that takes the character of Dracula, binds him to a cross, and keeps him locked up for most of the feature's running time. While the filmmakers' intentions were good, I can't really recommend this sequel to horror fans looking for true cinematic terror". Craig Villinger of Digital Retribution called the film "a disappointing sequel and a disappointing vampire film in general", adding: "Despite the obviously limited budget, Lussier has tried to make a visually impressive feature, and to an extent he succeeds, but ultimately the film is dragged down by an uneventful script, poor performances, and a terrible ending which offers the viewer no closure whatsoever".

See also
 Dracula III: Legacy
 Vampire film

References

External links
 
 
 

American supernatural horror films
Romanian supernatural horror films
American vampire films
English-language Romanian films
Dracula films
2003 horror films
2003 direct-to-video films
Direct-to-video horror films
Direct-to-video sequel films
Films shot in Romania
Films directed by Patrick Lussier
2003 films
Cultural depictions of Judas Iscariot
Portrayals of Jesus in film
Films with screenplays by Joel Soisson
Dimension Films films
Films produced by Joel Soisson
Dracula 2000 (film series)
2000s English-language films
2000s American films